Samuel Bagster  may refer to:

Samuel Bagster the Elder (1772–1851), English publisher
Samuel Bagster the Younger (1800–1835), English printer and author
Bagster & Sons, the publishing house they founded